John Ferguson (1836–1906) was an Ulster-born, Glasgow-based radical activist for Irish nationalism, Irish people in Scotland and the Scottish Labour Party. He worked closely with Michael Davitt.

References
 
 E.W. McFarland (2003). John Ferguson 1836–1906: Irish Issues In Scottish Politics, England. 
Scottish people of Irish descent
Scottish Labour Party (1888) politicians
Irish nationalists
Georgist politicians